Raju Debnath (born 14 December 1994) is an Indian footballer who plays as a midfielder for Aryan F.C. in the Calcutta Football League.

Career

United Sikkim
Debnath made his debut for United Sikkim F.C. on 22 September 2012 during an Indian Federation Cup match against Salgaocar F.C. at the JRD Tata Sports Complex in Jamshedpur, Jharkhand in which he was in Starting 11; United Sikkim lost the match 0–3.

Career statistics

Club
Statistics accurate as of 12 May 2013

References

Indian footballers
1994 births
Living people
Footballers from West Bengal
I-League players
Calcutta Football League players
United Sikkim F.C. players
Association football midfielders